Maryland is a state in the Mid-Atlantic region of the United States.

Maryland or Marylands  may also refer to:

Places

Africa
 Maryland, a district of Lagos, Nigeria
 Maryland County, Liberia
 Republic of Maryland, the Liberian county when it was an independent nation

Europe
 Maryland (Russia) or Marimland, a territory between Vetluga and Vyatka rivers, inhabited by Mari people
 Maryland, Brownsea Island, an abandoned village in Dorset, England
 Maryland, London, an area of Newham, London, England, United Kingdom
 Maryland, Monmouthshire, Wales, United Kingdom
 Maryland, an English rendering of Terra Mariana, a medieval Crusader state in the Baltic
 Marylands Nature Reserve, a Local Nature Reserve in Hockley, Essex, England

North America
 Maryland City, Maryland, a census-designated place in the U.S. state
 Province of Maryland, the U.S. state when it was an English colony
 Maryland, New York, United States, a town
 Maryland Manor, a neighborhood in Tampa, Florida

Elsewhere
 Maryland, New South Wales, near Newcastle, Australia
 Maryland, a crater on Thule, the smaller lobe of the Kuiper belt object 486958 Arrokoth

People with the name
 William Lutwiniak, who used the pseudonym "Mary Land"
 Russell Maryland, a former NFL football player

Arts, entertainment, and media
"Maryland, My Maryland", former state song of the U.S. state of Maryland
 Maryland (1940 film), an American film
 Maryland (2015 film) or Disorder, a French film
 My Maryland, a "musical romance"

Brands and enterprises
 Maryland (automobile), a car produced in Baltimore, Maryland, 1907–1910
 Maryland (cigarette), a Luxembourgish brand
 Maryland Cookies, a brand of biscuits produced by Burton's Foods in the United Kingdom

Education
 Marylands School, a school in Christchurch, New Zealand
 University System of Maryland
 University of Maryland, Baltimore, also known as "Maryland Medical School" and "Maryland Law School"
 University of Maryland, Baltimore County, specialising in science and engineering
 University of Maryland, College Park, the flagship campus
 University of Maryland Eastern Shore, located in Princess Anne, Maryland
 University of Maryland University College, campus located in Adelphi, Maryland, for adults and distance learning

Sports
 Baltimore Marylands, a short-lived 19th-century baseball team
 Maryland GAA, a Gaelic Athletic Association football team based in Drumraney, County Westmeath, Ireland
 Maryland Terrapins, the athletic program of the University of Maryland, College Park

Other uses
 A-22 Maryland (Martin Maryland), a United States-built light bomber aircraft
 Chicken Maryland
 Marylands, a country house in Surrey, England
 USS Maryland

See also